Pokémon: The Mastermind of Mirage Pokémon is a special hour-long episode of the Pokémon anime series created for the tenth anniversary of the franchise. This special premiered on Kids' WB on April 29, 2006 (with the Kayzie Rogers version). It became available on DVD in the United States on September 19 that year as a special feature on the 2-disc Pokémon: Lucario and the Mystery of Mew release (with the Sarah Natochenny version), and the original dub aired on October 28 in the same year on Cartoon Network. In Japan the special was available for download on the official site October 13–31, 2006. The events of the specials take place during the 8th season of Pokémon: Advanced Battle.

This special marked the first time English-language production was handled exclusively by Pokémon USA (now known as The Pokémon Company International). Previously, 4Kids Entertainment (now known as Konami Cross Media NY) was mostly responsible for the Pokémon anime English dub. As a result of this change, costs were cut, and the English-language version of the special featured an all-new voice cast, replacing the original voice actors for many major characters, many of whom had worked on the show for eight years. The only three who returned were Rodger Parsons as the narrator, James Carter Cathcart (under the pseudonym Jimmy Zoppi), who voiced several recurring characters like Gary Oak, and Kayzie Rogers, who voiced minor characters and over 50 Pokémon throughout the show. Beginning with this special, Cathcart additionally carried over the roles of James and Meowth (using the pseudonym Billy Beach in the special) and Rogers also provided the voice for Max (using the pseudonym Jamie Peacock in the special). Rogers also voiced Ash for the original version of the special, but was subsequently replaced by Sarah Natochenny.

This change caused controversy and extremely negative reception among many fans as it considered one of the worst Pokémon specials ever made. It was announced at the 2006 San Diego Comic-Con that the version available on DVD would be improved from that aired on TV, with dialogue being re-recorded after the new voice cast became more familiar with their roles, and after Ash was given another new voice actor, Sarah Natochenny. The redub was included as a bonus disc on the home media release of Pokémon: Lucario and the Mystery of Mew.

Cast

Notes

External links 

 The Mastermind of Mirage Pokémon at Bulbapedia
 
 

2006 anime films
2006 television films
2006 films
2006 television specials
2000s animated television specials
Japanese television specials
American animated television films
Anime television films
Holography in fiction
Mastermind of Mirage Pokemon